Zemko is a surname. Notable people with the surname include:

Josip Zemko (born 1946), Yugoslav footballer and manager
Juraj Zemko (born 1989), Slovak ice hockey player
Yevgeniy Zemko (born 1996), Belarusian footballer

See also
 Zemke